Arthur Pratt may refer to:

 Arthur Pratt, deputy U.S. marshall, son of Sarah Marinda Bates Pratt and Orson Pratt
 Arthur Clarence Pratt (1871–1948), office manager and political figure in Ontario